John Edward "Bubbles" Reese (April 19, 1895 - October 5, 1966) was a Negro league baseball outfielder and manager for two years before the founding of the first Negro National League in 1920, until his final season in 1931.

In 1917, a 22 year-old Reese registered for the World War I draft. He listed his employer and home address as Morris Brown University in Atlanta, Georgia; his occupation was listed as a janitor in the Odd Fellow Building as single but with a 3-year-old child and mother listed as dependents.

Reese played for a number of teams, most notably with the St. Louis Stars, who he played for seven seasons. He also managed the team on three occasions, leading them to the best record in the league twice.

References

External links
 and Baseball-Reference Black Baseball stats and Seamheads
  and Seamheads

Chicago American Giants players
St. Louis Stars (baseball) players
Toledo Tigers players
Bacharach Giants players
Detroit Stars players
Hilldale Club players
1895 births
1966 deaths